Miracle match or miracle game are terms sometimes used to refer to sporting events with highly unexpected outcomes (a significant upset) or very dramatic finishes. The term may refer to one of the following:

Film and literature
 Miracle (2004 film), a film about the United States men's ice hockey team at the 1980 Winter Olympics 
 Miracle on Ice (1981 film), an earlier film about the same topic
 The Miracle Game, a 1972 Czech novel by Josef Škvorecký
 The Miracle Match, an alternate title for The Game of Their Lives (2005 film) about the 1950 FIFA World Cup victory of the United States over England
 The Miracle Season, a 2018 film about an American high school volleyball team following the 2011 sudden death of its team captain

Sports
Note: a "miracle" name can refer to an entire game, its defining play, or both.

American football

College
 Bluegrass Miracle, the 74-yard game-winning pass in a 2002 game between the LSU Tigers and Kentucky Wildcats
 Miracle Bowl, the 1980 Holiday Bowl, a bowl game between the SMU Mustangs and BYU Cougars
 Miracle at Michigan, the final play in the 1994 game between the Colorado Buffaloes and Michigan Wolverines
 Miracle in Miami, also known as Hail Flutie, the 1984 game between the Boston College Eagles and Miami Hurricanes
 Mississippi Miracle, the final play in the 2007 Trinity vs. Millsaps football game

Professional
 Mile High Miracle, a 2013 Baltimore Ravens–Denver Broncos 2013 NFL playoff game
 Minneapolis Miracle, a 2018 Minnesota Vikings–New Orleans Saints NFL playoff game
 Miracle at the Meadowlands, a 1978 Philadelphia Eagles–New York Giants NFL game
 Miracle at the Met, a 1980 Minnesota Vikings–Cleveland Browns NFL game
 Miracle at the New Meadowlands, a 2010 Philadelphia Eagles–New York Giants NFL game
 Miracle in Miami, a 2018 Miami Dolphins–New England Patriots NFL game
 Miracle in Motown, a 2015 Green Bay Packers–Detroit Lions NFL game
 Monday Night Miracle (American football), a 2000 New York Jets–Miami Dolphins NFL game
 Monday Night Miracle, a 2005 Washington Redskins–Dallas Cowboys NFL game
 Music City Miracle, a 2000 Tennessee Titans–Buffalo Bills NFL playoff game

Australian rules football
 1963 Miracle Match, a match between the Fitzroy Lions and Geelong Cats
 Miracle on Grass (Australian rules football), a 2013 match between the Brisbane Lions and Geelong Cats

Baseball
 The Miracle of Coogan's Bluff, the game-winning home run scored by Bobby Thomson of the New York Giants against the Brooklyn Dodgers on October 3, 1951

Ice hockey
 Miracle in Espoo, a 2019 women's game between Finland and Canada
 Miracle on Ice, a 1980 Winter Olympics game between the United States and the Soviet Union
 Miracle on Manchester, a 1982 Los Angeles Kings–Edmonton Oilers NHL postseason game
 The Monday Night Miracle (ice hockey), a 1986 Calgary Flames–St. Louis Blues NHL postseason game